The World Invasion Tour was a concert tour by hard rock band Van Halen in support of their third studio album, Women and Children First.

Background
The tour was dubbed the "Party 'til You Die Tour" by the band. The tour is notable for being the first time the band played keyboards live during their shows, which would later play a role on the band's next three studio albums. The band skipped Japan on the tour, focused on playing in other smaller cities in North America, with a month of performances in Europe. Unlike the previous tours, this tour had ended up more successful. During the performance in Cincinnati, Roth was accused of inciting others to violate the fire code when he told the crowd to "light 'em up!", urging them to smoke with the audience lighting both matches and lighters during the song "Light Up the Sky". He was written up and later charged for violating fire codes. He would later break his nose during a television appearance in Italy when he did his famous leap, hitting a light fixture.

During the tour, the band had carried 50 tons of equipment, and 850,000 watts of lightning which Alex Van Halen stated would be in the Guinness Book of World Records. The extensive stage itself featured a plane of multi-colored lights, choreographed with each song performed, with multi-platform stage to the right side where Eddie Van Halen would perform a guitar solo with seven lights pointing at him from behind to create a silhouette effect. Before every show, Van Halen demanded that in their dressing rooms that they'd have two pounds of M&M's with all the brown ones removed.

Set list

Songs played overall
"Romeo Delight"
"Bottoms Up!"
Alex Van Halen drum solo
"Runnin' with the Devil"
"Tora! Tora!" and "Loss of Control"
"Take Your Whiskey Home"
"Dance the Night Away"
"Women in Love..."
"Jamie's Cryin'"
"Feel Your Love Tonight"
"Bright Lights, Big City" ("Jimmy Reed" cover)
"Atomic Punk"
"Everybody Wants Some!!"
"And the Cradle Will Rock..."
"Somebody Get Me a Doctor"
"Light Up the Sky"
"On Fire"
Eddie Van Halen guitar solo, "Eruption", "Spanish Fly" and "Cathedral"
"Ain't Talkin' 'Bout Love"
Encore
"Ice Cream Man" ("John Brim" cover)
"Growth" and "You Really Got Me" ("The Kinks" cover)

Typical set list
"Romeo Delight"
"Bottoms Up!"
Alex Van Halen drum solo
"Runnin' with the Devil"
"Tora! Tora! + Loss of Control"
"Take Your Whiskey Home"
"Dance the Night Away"
"Women in Love..."
"Jamie's Cryin'"
"Bright Lights, Big City" ("Jimmy Reed" cover)
"Everybody Wants Some!!"
"And the Cradle Will Rock..."
"On Fire"
Eddie Van Halen guitar solo, "Eruption", "Spanish Fly" and "Cathedral"
"Ain't Talkin' 'Bout Love"
Encore
"Ice Cream Man" ("John Brim" cover)
"Growth" and "You Really Got Me" ("The Kinks" cover)

Tour dates

Box office score data

Personnel
 Eddie Van Halen – guitar, backing vocals
 David Lee Roth – lead vocals, acoustic guitar
 Michael Anthony – bass, keyboards, backing vocals
 Alex Van Halen – drums

References

Citations

General sources

Van Halen concert tours
1980 concert tours